This is a list of significant droughts, organized by large geographical area and then year.

Africa
1983–1985 famine in Ethiopia
2008–2009 Kenya Drought
2011 East Africa drought
Sahel drought
2010 Sahel famine
2012 Sahel drought
2018–2021 Southern African drought
2020-2022 Horn of Africa drought
Food security in Malawi

Australia
Drought in Australia
Federation Drought (1901)
1911–1916 Australian drought
1979–1983 Eastern Australian drought
2000s Australian drought

China
1875 Drought and subsequent famine
2010 China drought and dust storms
2010–11 China drought

Europe 

 1540 European drought
 2022 European drought

South Pacific
2011 Tuvalu drought

United States
 
1935 Black Sunday (storm)
1934–35 North American drought
1983–1985 North American drought
1988–1990 North American drought
2002 North American drought
2010–2013 Southern United States and Mexico drought
2011–2017 California drought
2012–2013 North American drought
2016 New York drought
2020–2022 North American drought

South America
Drought in Chile
Petorca water crisis (2010–present)
Drought in Northeastern Brazil
Grande Seca (1877–78)

Soviet Union

United Kingdom
1906 UK Drought and Heatwave
1911 UK Drought and Heatwave
1955 UK Drought and Heatwave
1976 UK Drought and Heatwave1
1990 UK Drought and Heatwave
1995 UK Drought and Heatwave (The drought generally lasted until Summer 1997)
2003 UK Drought and Heatwave
2006 UK Drought and Heatwave
2011 UK Drought and March–April Heatwave (The drought continued from 2010 and lasted through until March 2012)
Part of the 2010-2012 UK Drought. 2011 UK September–October Heatwave

Part of the 2010-2012 UK Drought. 2012 UK March Heatwave

External links
water.usgs.gov

Droughts